Corneliussen is a surname. Notable people with the surname include:

Charlotte Corneliussen, Danish cricketer 
Elias Corneliussen (1881–1951), Norwegian military officer 
Stephanie Corneliussen (born 1987), Danish actress and model 
Torleiv Corneliussen (1890–1975), Norwegian sailor